The Olmedilla Photovoltaic Park is a 60-megawatt (MW) photovoltaic power plant, located in Olmedilla de Alarcón, Spain. When completed in July 2008, it was the world's largest power plant using photovoltaic technology.

The plant employs more than 270,000 conventional solar panels, using  solar cells made of conventional crystalline silicon. Olmedilla generates about 87,500 megawatt-hours per year, enough to power 40,000 homes. Construction of the plant cost €384 million (US$530 million).

See also 

 List of photovoltaic power stations

References 

Photovoltaic power stations in Spain
Energy in Castilla–La Mancha